Fontalovskaya is a rural locality (a selo) in Temryuksky District of Krasnodar Krai in Southern Russia. Population:

References 

Rural localities in Krasnodar Krai
Temryuksky District